USS Dorothy (SP-1289) was a United States Navy patrol vessel in commission from 1917 to 1918.

Dorothy was built as a civilian motorboat of the same name in 1911. On 17 August 1917, the U.S. Navy acquired her from her owner, the Conservation Commission of Maryland, for use as a section patrol boat during World War I. She was commissioned as USS Dorothy (SP-1289) and was reported as being "already in service" on 13 September 1917.

Assigned to the 5th Naval District, Dorothy served on patrol duties in the Maryland and Virginia area.

The Navy returned Dorothy to the Conservation Commission on either 24 September or 27 November 1918.

Notes

References
 
 Department of the Navy Naval History and Heritage Command Online Library of Selected Images: Civilian Ships: Dorothy (American Motor Boat, 1911). Served as USS Dorothy (SP-1289) in 1917-1918
 NavSource Online: Section Patrol Craft Photo Archive Dorothy (SP 1289)

Maritime history of Maryland
Chesapeake Bay boats
Patrol vessels of the United States Navy
World War I patrol vessels of the United States
1911 ships